Paul Darley (born ) is a former professional rugby league footballer who played in the 1990s and 2000s.

Playing career

International honours
Paul Darley won caps for Ireland while at Featherstone Rovers 2004 3-caps (sub).

Club career
Paul Darley was transferred from Kippax Welfare ARLFC to Castleford on 18 September 1992, he made his début for the Featherstone Rovers on 17 December 2000, and he played his last match for the Featherstone Rovers during the 2004 season.

References

External links
Paul Darley Memory Box Search at archive.castigersheritage.com
 
 

1974 births
Living people
Castleford Tigers players
Featherstone Rovers players
Hull F.C. players
Ireland national rugby league team players
Place of birth missing (living people)
Rugby league hookers
Rugby league locks
Rugby league second-rows
York Wasps players